Christ Crowned with Thorns is a c.1500 oil on panel painting by Albrecht Bouts, now in the Musée des Beaux-Arts de Lyon, which acquired it in 2011.

Sources
http://www.culture.gouv.fr/public/mistral/joconde_fr?ACTION=CHERCHER&FIELD_1=REF&VALUE_1=000PE030019

Flemish paintings
Bouts
Paintings in the collection of the Museum of Fine Arts of Lyon
1500 paintings